Blue Skies is an a cappella album by the Virginians barbershop chorus, the Richmond chapter of the Barbershop Harmony Society.

According to the liner notes, this album was recorded live at the University of Richmond's Modlin Center for the Performing Arts (Camp Theater). It was released in April 2008.

Track listing
 "Blue Skies" –
 "Yesterday" –
 "Take Me Out to the Ballgame" (parody) –
 "Didn't We" –
 "Fit as a Fiddle" –
 "Mood Indigo" –
 "Can't Help Falling in Love / Love Me Tender Medley" –
 "Beautiful Dreamer" –
 "American Medley" –
 "This Is My Country"
 "America the Beautiful"
 "Battle Hymn of the Republic"
 "God Bless America"

2008 live albums
A cappella albums
Barbershop Harmony Society
Barbershop music
Self-released albums